Moss Fotballklubb is a Norwegian football club, founded on 28 August 1906. They play in the 1. divisjon, the second highest division in the Norwegian football league system. They played in the Norwegian top flight between 1937-1939, 1953-1954, 1977-1985 (9 seasons), 1987-1990 (4 seasons), 1996 and 1998-2002. The club came close to earning promotion to the top flight in 2005, but lost the play-off against Molde.

Stadium
Moss play their home games at Melløs stadion, which has a capacity of around 10,000. Because of national rules of professional license for top clubs in Norway, the stadium has only been certified for 3,085 spectators. Built in 1939, it has remained the club's home ground ever since. The record attendance is 10,085, set in 2003 against rivals Fredrikstad. A higher attendance may have been achieved in 1976 in a match against Odd, but no precise figure exists for this match because the gates broke down after around 9500 spectators had shown up.

Recent history 
{|class="wikitable"
|-bgcolor="#efefef"
! Season
! 
! Pos.
! Pl.
! W
! D
! L
! GS
! GA
! P
!Cup
!Notes
|-
|2006
|1. divisjon
|align=right |8
|align=right|30||align=right|11||align=right|7||align=right|12
|align=right|61||align=right|46||align=right|40
|Third round
|
|-
|2007
|1. divisjon
|align=right |5
|align=right|30||align=right|15||align=right|8||align=right|7
|align=right|46||align=right|37||align=right|53
|Third round
|
|-
|2008
|1. divisjon
|align=right |9
|align=right|30||align=right|9||align=right|12||align=right|9
|align=right|63||align=right|54||align=right|39
||Third round
|
|-
|2009
|1. divisjon
|align=right |7
|align=right|30||align=right|12||align=right|5||align=right|13
|align=right|47||align=right|53||align=right|41
||Second round
|
|-
|2010
|1. divisjon
|align=right bgcolor="#FFCCCC"| 15
|align=right|28||align=right|7||align=right|5||align=right|16
|align=right|32||align=right|56||align=right|26
||Third round
|Relegated
|-
|2011 
|2. divisjon
|align=right |10
|align=right|26||align=right|11||align=right|5||align=right|10
|align=right|58||align=right|56||align=right|38
||First round
|
|-
|2012 
|2. divisjon
|align=right |10
|align=right|26||align=right|8||align=right|6||align=right|12
|align=right|43||align=right|46||align=right|30
|Second round
|
|-
|2013
|2. divisjon
|align=right |9
|align=right|26||align=right|10||align=right|3||align=right|13
|align=right|47||align=right|53||align=right|33
|Second round
|
|-
|2014
|2. divisjon
|align=right |3
|align=right|26||align=right|16||align=right|5||align=right|5
|align=right|69||align=right|24||align=right|53
|Second round
|
|-
|2015 
|2. divisjon
|align=right |2
|align=right|26||align=right|18||align=right|3||align=right|5
|align=right|65||align=right|31||align=right|57
|First round
|
|-
|2016 
|2. divisjon
|align=right bgcolor="#FFCCCC"| 11
|align=right|26||align=right|9||align=right|8||align=right|9
|align=right|57||align=right|55||align=right|35
|Second round
|Relegated
|-
|2017 
|3. divisjon
|align=right bgcolor=#DDFFDD| 1
|align=right|26||align=right|20||align=right|3||align=right|3
|align=right|88||align=right|22||align=right|63
|Second round
|Promoted
|-
|2018 
|2. divisjon
|align=right |9
|align=right|26||align=right|7||align=right|9||align=right|10
|align=right|37||align=right|42||align=right|30
|Second round
|
|-
|2019  
|2. divisjon
|align=right |8
|align=right|26||align=right|10||align=right|4||align=right|12
|align=right|35||align=right|46||align=right|34
|Second round
|
|-
|2020  
|2. divisjon
|align=right |12
|align=right|13||align=right|3||align=right|2||align=right|8
|align=right|16||align=right|24||align=right|11
|Cancelled
|
|-
|2021
|2. divisjon
|align=right |10
|align=right|26||align=right|8||align=right|5||align=right|13
|align=right|44||align=right|51||align=right|29
|Third round
|
|-
|2022
|2. divisjon
|align=right bgcolor=#DDFFDD| 1
|align=right|24||align=right|18||align=right|2||align=right|4
|align=right|46||align=right|23||align=right|56
|Third round
|Promoted
|}
Source:

Current squad

Coaching staff

In European football

Honours 
Norwegian top flight:
Gold medal (1): 1987
Silver medal (1): 1979
Norwegian Cup:
Winners (1): 1983
Runners-up (1): 1981

Records 

Greatest home victory: 7–0 vs. Steinkjer FK, June 17, 1978
Greatest away victory: 9–1 vs. Borre IF, May 5, 2004
Heaviest home loss: 1–6 vs. FK Bodø/Glimt, August 2, 2000
Heaviest away loss: 0–8 vs. Molde FK, April 21, 1996
Highest recorded attendance, Melløs stadion: 10,085 vs. Fredrikstad FK, October 26, 2003
Highest average attendance, season: 5814, 1979
Most appearances, total: 569, Geir Henæs
Most appearances, Norwegian top flight: 227, Geir Henæs
Most goals scored, Norwegian top flight: 78, Geir Henæs

References

External links 
 
Unofficial supporters site

 
Association football clubs established in 1906
1906 establishments in Norway
Eliteserien clubs
Sport in Moss, Norway